Arthur Wilkinson (15 August 1888 – 13 August 1969) was an Australian rules footballer who played for the Collingwood Football Club and Essendon Football Club in the Victorian Football League (VFL).

He later played with Hawthorn in the Victorian Football Association.

Notes

External links 

		
Art Wilkinson's profile at Collingwood Forever

1888 births
1969 deaths
VFL/AFL players born in England
Australian rules footballers from Victoria (Australia)
Collingwood Football Club players
Essendon Football Club players
Hawthorn Football Club (VFA) players
Australian military personnel of World War I
Sportspeople from Melton Mowbray
English emigrants to Australia
Military personnel from Victoria (Australia)